The River Delta Unified School District is located in Sacramento County, California, United States. It extends into Solano and Yolo County.

Schools
The district consists of the following schools:
Elementary Schools
Bates-School 
Delta Elementary Charter School
Isleton School
Walnut Grove Elementary
D.H. White Elementary
Middle School
Clarksburg Middle School
Riverview Middle School
High School
Delta High School 
Mokelumne Continuation High School
Rio Vista High School
Other
River Delta High School/Elementary School (Independent Study)
Wing River High School (Adult School)

Governance
Katherine Wright - Superintendent
 Alicia Fernandez  - Board President
 Don Olson - Vice President
 Marilyn Riley - Clerk
 Rafaela Casillas - Member
 Dan Mahoney - Member
 Jennifer Stone - Member
 Chris Elliot - Member

References

External links
 

School districts in Solano County, California
School districts in Yolo County, California